Loeske E. B. Kruuk is an evolutionary ecologist who is a Royal Society Research Professor at the University of Edinburgh. She was awarded the 2018 European Society for Evolutionary Biology President's Award.

Early life and education 
Kruuk started her academic career in 1988 studying mathematics at Somerville College, Oxford. She switched to biology with an MSc in Ecology at the University of Aberdeen, and then a PhD in population genetics at the University of Edinburgh, where she investigated amphibian hybrid zones with Nick Barton. For postdoctoral researcher with Tim Clutton-Brock at the University of Cambridge and Josephine Pemberton at the University of Edinburgh, she studied evolutionary processes in red deer. During this position, she started to appreciate the power of long-term wild animal population studies in understanding evolutionary ecology and quantitative genetics.

Research and career 
In 2000, Kruuk held a Royal Society University Research Fellow at the University of Edinburgh, and became Professor of Evolutionary Ecology in 2009. She moved to the Australian National University in 2012, where she was awarded an Australian Research Council fellowship. Her research laboratory investigated the influence of climate change on animal populations. She mainly considered wild vertebrate species, including red deer, Soay sheep, and Australian wrens. Her work considers evolution and natural selection in wild animal populations, effects of ongoing environmental change, quantitative genetics, inbreeding and inbreeding depression, maternal effects and life history evolution. She won an Australian Research Council Laureate Fellowship in 2020.

In 2021, Kruuk was selected as one of the Royal Society Research Professors, which allowed her to return to the University of Edinburgh. There she investigates the impacts of environmental change on natural populations.

She is an Editor of the biological journal Proceedings of the Royal Society Series B Biological Sciences.

Personal life 
Kruuk has three children, a daughter and twin boys.

Awards and honours 
 2006 Philip Leverhulme Prize
 2008 Zoological Society of London Scientific Medal
 2012 Elected Fellow of the Royal Society of Edinburgh
 2012 Australian Research Council Future Fellowship
 2014 Elected member of the European Molecular Biology Organization
 2015 The Genetics Society Mary Lyon Medal
 2018 European Society for Evolutionary Biology President's Award
 2020 Australian Research Council Laureate Fellowship 
 2021 Royal Society Research Professor

Selected publications

References 

Living people
Year of birth missing (living people)
Academic staff of the Australian National University
Academics of the University of Edinburgh
Alumni of the University of Edinburgh
Alumni of Somerville College, Oxford
British women scientists